This article is about the particular significance of the year 1725 to Wales and its people.

Incumbents
Lord Lieutenant of North Wales (Lord Lieutenant of Anglesey, Caernarvonshire, Denbighshire, Flintshire, Merionethshire, Montgomeryshire) – Hugh Cholmondeley, 1st Earl of Cholmondeley (until 18 January); George Cholmondeley, 2nd Earl of Cholmondeley (from 7 April) 
Lord Lieutenant of Glamorgan – vacant until 1729
Lord Lieutenant of Brecknockshire and Lord Lieutenant of Monmouthshire – Sir William Morgan of Tredegar
Lord Lieutenant of Cardiganshire – John Vaughan, 2nd Viscount Lisburne
Lord Lieutenant of Carmarthenshire – vacant until 1755 
Lord Lieutenant of Pembrokeshire – Sir Arthur Owen, 3rd Baronet
Lord Lieutenant of Radnorshire – James Brydges, 1st Duke of Chandos

Bishop of Bangor – William Baker
Bishop of Llandaff – Robert Clavering (from 2 January)
Bishop of St Asaph – John Wynne
Bishop of St Davids – Richard Smalbroke (from 3 February)

Events

7 April - George Cholmondeley, 2nd Earl of Cholmondeley, succeeds his late brother as Lord Lieutenant of North Wales.
4 May - Ann Thomas (the "Maid of Cefn Ydfa") marries Anthony Maddocks.
date unknown
Silvanus Bevan is elected a Fellow of the Royal Society on the recommendation of Sir Isaac Newton.
Sir John Philipps, 6th Baronet, marries Elizabeth Shepherd.
Matthew Maddox becomes organist of St David's Cathedral.

Arts and literature

New books
Dafydd Lewis - Golwg ar y Byd
William Lewis & Evan Pryce - Maddeuant i'r Edifairiol

Births
28 March - William Morgan (of Tredegar, younger), politician (died 1763)
May - Llewellin Penrose, painter and writer (died 1791) 
7 September - Francis Homfray, industrialist (died 1798)
date unknown - Michael Lort, clergyman, academic and antiquary (died 1790)

Deaths
18 January - Hugh Cholmondeley, 1st Earl of Cholmondeley, Lord Lieutenant of North Wales, 62
20 July - Edward Jeffreys, 55, judge
25 July - Rev Thomas Griffith, 80, first pastor of Welsh Tract Baptist Church, Delaware, USA.
29 November - William Jones, 49, Principal of Jesus College, Oxford.
15 December - Francis Edwardes, politician
date unknown - Silvanus Bevan, burgess of Swansea

References

1720s in Wales
Years of the 18th century in Wales